Albert Gleason Ruliffson (April 1, 1833 – May 2, 1896) was a minister and the founder in 1879 of the Bowery Mission in Manhattan's Bowery neighborhood. He served as President of its Board of Trustees and was active in its work until September, 1895. 

He was born on April 1, 1833, in Gilboa, New York, to Ruliff Ruliffson and Candace Gleason. He died in Perth Amboy, New Jersey.

References
Notes

1833 births
1896 deaths
Protestant missionaries in the United States
American Protestant missionaries
People from Schoharie County, New York